Maram (February 10, 2006 – September 6, 2012 in Kentucky) is an American Thoroughbred racehorse best known for winning the 2008 Breeders' Cup Juvenile Fillies Turf.

In 2009, Maram won the John Hettinger Stakes at Saratoga Race Course.

Maram was euthanized on September 6, 2012, after an acute illness. She left behind her first foal, a 2012 colt by Giant's Causeway. She was in foal to Elusive Quality at the time of her death.

References
 Maram's pedigree and partial racing stats

External links
 Maram's pedigree and partial racing stats

2006 racehorse births
2012 racehorse deaths
Thoroughbred family 20-a
Racehorses bred in Kentucky
Racehorses trained in the United States
Breeders' Cup Juvenile Fillies Turf winners